This is a list of notable Native American women of the United States. It should contain only Native women of the United States and its territories, not First Nations women or Native women of Central and South America. Native American identity is a complex and contested issue. The Bureau of Indian Affairs defines Native American as having American Indian or Alaska Native ancestry.

Legally, being Native American is defined as being enrolled in a federally recognized tribe or Alaskan village. These entities establish their own membership rules, and they vary. Each must be understood independently.

Ethnologically, factors such as culture, history, language, religion, and familial kinships can influence Native American identity.

All individuals on this list should have Native American ancestry. Historical figures might predate tribal enrollment practices and may be included based on reliable sources that document ethnological tribal membership.

Any contemporary individuals should either be enrolled members of federally recognized tribes, or have cited Native American ancestry and be recognized as Native American by their respective tribes. Contemporary individuals who are not enrolled in a tribe but are documented as having tribal descent are listed as being "of descent" from a tribe.

A

 Louise Abeita (E-Yeh-Shure', Blue Corn) (born 1926), Isleta Pueblo author
 Alberta Schenck Adams (1928–2009), Iñupiaq civil rights activist
 Aguilar sisters, Kewa Pueblo potters
 Tahnee Ahtone, Kiowa/Muscogee/Seminole curator, museum professional, beadwork artist, textile artist
 Elsie Allen, Cloverdale Pomo basket weaver
 Paula Gunn Allen (1939–2008), Laguna Pueblo/Sioux/Lebanese poet, activist, literary critic, and novelist
 Tammie Allen (Walking Spirit), Jicarilla Apache, potter
 Queen Alliquippa (died 1754), Seneca Nation leader
 Princess Angeline (Suquamish/Duwamish, ca. 1820–1896), daughter of Chief Seattle
 Queen Ann (ca. 1650–ca. 1725), chief of the Pamunkey tribe
 Annie Antone, Tohono O'odham basket weaver
 Annette Arkeketa, Otoe-Missouria poet, playwright
 Anna Mae Pictou Aquash (1945–1976), Mi'qmaq Indians rights activist
 Awashonks (fl. mid- to late 17th c.), chief of the Sakonett tribe
 Annette Arkeketa, Otoe-Missouria/Muscogee writer

B

 Margarete Bagshaw (Santa Clara Pueblo-descent, born 1964), painter and gallerist
 Natalie Ball, Klamath/Modoc, born 1980, interdisciplinary artist
 Joyce Begay-Foss, Navajo textile weaver, educator, and curator
 Diane E. Benson (born 1954), Tlingit author
 Mary Knight Benson, Pomo basket weaver
 Martha Berry, Cherokee Nation bead artist and educator
 Carrie Bethel, Mono Lake Paiute basket weaver, 1898–1974
 Gloria Bird, Spokane Tribe of the Spokane Reservation poet and critic
 Mary Holiday Black (ca. 1934), Navajo basket maker and textile artist
 Black Buffalo Woman (Lakota), first wife of Crazy Horse
 Black Shawl (Lakota, died 1920), second wife of Crazy Horse
 Kimberley M. Blaeser (born 1955), White Earth Ojibwe writer
 Blue Corn (ca. 1920–1999), San Ildefonso Pueblo potter
 Rita Pitka Blumenstein (1936–2021), Yup'ik traditional healer, founding member of the International Council of Thirteen Indigenous Grandmothers
 Bowdash, Kootenai two-spirit warrior
 Beth Brant (born 1941), Bay of Quinte Mohawk
 Mary Brant, Mohawk leader
 Mary Brave Bird (1953–2013), Brulé Lakota writer and activist
 Bras Piqué, Natchez woman who tried to warn the French of her tribe's plans to attack them
 Ignatia Broker (1919–1987), Ojibwa writer
 Ticasuk Brown (1904-1982), Iñupiaq educator, poet and writer
 Vee F. Browne, Navajo author
 Buffalo Bird Woman, Hidatsa author
 Buffalo Calf Road Woman, Cheyenne cultural hero
 Olivia Ward Bush-Banks (Montaukett, 1869–1944) author, poet, and journalist of African-American and Native American descent

C
 Sophia Alice Callahan (1868-1894) Muscogee novelist and teacher
 Caroline Cannon, Iñupiaq environmental activist, 2012 Goldman Environmental Prize winner, mayor of Point Hope, Alaska 1998–2001
 Gladys Cardiff (born 1942), poet and academic of Eastern Band Cherokee descent
 Poldine Carlo (1920–2018), Koyukon activist and writer
 Kathleen Carlo-Kendall, Koyukon artist, daughter of Poldine Carlo
 Tonantzin Carmelo, Tongva/Kumeyaay-descent actress
 Lorna Dee Cervantes (born 1954), Chicana/Chumash-descent
 Nellie Charlie (1867–1965) Mono Lake Paiute basketweaver
 Quannah Chasinghorse (born 2002), model and land protector
 Marie Z. Chino, Acoma Pueblo potter
 Vera Chino, Acoma Pueblo potter
 Chipeta (1843/4–1924), Kiowa Apache, beadwork artist and wife of Chief Ouray
 Yvonne Chouteau (1929–2016), Shawnee Tribe ballerina
 Kelly Church, Gun Lake Potawatomi/Odawa/Ojibwe basket maker, birch bark biter, painter, and environmental activist
 Chrystos (born 1946), Menominee-descent two-spirit poet
 Mildred Cleghorn (Fort Sill Apache Tribe, 1910–1997), tribal chairperson, doll maker
 Elouise Cobell (Blackfeet), executive director of the Native American Community Development Corporation
 Radmilla Cody (Navajo/African American), Navajo language singer, 46th Miss Navajo Nation
 Colestah, Yakama, wife of Chief Kamiakin
 Lyda Conley (Wyandot, 1874–1946), first Native American female attorney, and first Native American woman admitted to argue a case before the U.S. Supreme Court. Wyandot Nation activist and attorney
 Elizabeth Cook-Lynn, Crow Creek Sioux poet and novelist
 Hilda Coriz, Kewa Pueblo potter
 Cuhtahlatah, 18th-century Cherokee heroine

D
 Dahteste, Apache fighter and compatriot to Geronimo
 Carrie Dann, Western Shoshone activist
 Mary Dann (died 2005), Western Shoshone activist
 Nora Marks Dauenhauer (Tlingit, 1927–2017), poet and ethnolinguist
 Alice Brown Davis (Seminole Nation of Oklahoma, 1852–1935), Principal Chief
Jenny L. Davis, Chickasaw author, linguist, and anthropologist
 Angel De Cora, Ho-Chunk artist and lecturer
 Ada Deer, Menominee author, activist, and the first Native American woman to head the Bureau of Indian Affairs
Andrea Delgado-Olson, Ione Miwok, computer scientist
 Ella Cara Deloria (Yankton Dakota, 1888–1971), educator, anthropologist, ethnographer, linguist, and novelist
Natalie Diaz (Mojave/Pima, born 1978),  poet, language activist, former professional basketball player, and educator
 Mavis Doering, Cherokee Nation (1929–2007) basket weaver
 Do-Hum-Me, Sac entertainer
 Virginia Driving Hawk Sneve, Brulé Lakota writer and educator
 Juanita Suazo Dubray, Taos Pueblo potter
 Joyce Dugan (Eastern Band Cherokee), first female elected chief of the Eastern Band of Cherokee Indians

E
Eagle of Delight (Otoe, c. 1795–1822), emissary
Chief Earth Woman, Ojibwa warrior
Ehyophsta, Cheyenne warrior
Heid E. Erdrich (Turtle Mountain Ojibweborn 1963), writer and editor of poetry, short stories, and nonfiction, and maker of poem films.
Louise Erdrich (Turtle Mountain Ojibwe, born 1954), writer

F
 Corine Fairbanks, Oglala Lakota author and activist
Larissa FastHorse, Sicangu Lakota playwright and choreographer
 Fidelia Fielding (1827–1908), last native speaker of the Mohegan Pequot language
 Cecilia Fire Thunder (Oglala Lakota, born 1946), former president of the Oglala Sioux Tribe
Te Ata Fisher (1895–1995), Chickasaw Nation storyteller and actress
Elaine Fleming, Leech Lake Ojibwe mayor of Cass Lake, Minnesota
Jennifer Foerster, Muscogee poet
L. Frank, Tongva/Ajachmen Indian artist, tribal scholar, and activist
Kalyn Free, Choctaw Nation of Oklahoma lawyer and activist

G
 Martha George (1892–1987), Suquamish tribal chairman
 Glory of the Morning (born 1709), Ho-Chunk chief
 Rose Gonzales (ca. 1900–1989), Ohkay Owingeh Pueblo potter
 Shan Goshorn (Eastern Band Cherokee, 1957–2018)), visual artist
 Katherine Gottlieb (born ca. 1952), Alutiiq health care executive and 2004 MacArthur Fellow
 Janice Gould, Koyangk'auwi Maidu writer
 Gouyen, Apache warrior
 Dorothy Grant, Alaska-born Haida fashion designer active in Canada
 Teri Greeves, Kiowa beadwork artist
Linda LeGarde Grover (Bois Forte Chippewa), novelist and short story writer
 Juanita Growing Thunder Fogarty, Assiniboine/Sioux bead worker and quill worker
 Margaret Gutierrez, Santa Clara Pueblo potter

H
 Janet Campbell Hale, Coeur d'Alene-Kootenay-Cree-Irish writer
 Hanging Cloud, Ojibwa warrior
 Helen Hardin, Tsa-Sah-Wee-Eh (1934–1984), Santa Clara Pueblo painter
 Joy Harjo, Muscogee poet, lecturer, and musician
 Suzan Shown Harjo, Southern Cheyenne/Muscogee activist
 LaDonna Harris, Comanche president of Americans for Indian Opportunity
 Ernestine Hayes (Tlingit, born 1945), memoirist
 Robbie Hedges, first elected woman chief of the Peoria tribe
 Rosella Hightower, Choctaw-Shawnee Tribe, born 1920, ballerina
 Joan Hill (Muscogee (Creek) Nation/Cherokee, 1930–2020), painter
 Linda Hogan (Chickasaw, born 1947), poet, storyteller, academic, playwright, novelist, environmentalist and writer of short stories.
 Minnie Hollow Wood, Lakota woman who fought at the Battle of Little Big Horn
 Hononegah (Ho-Chunk, ca. 1814–1847),  pioneer
 LeAnne Howe, Choctaw Nation of Oklahoma writer
 Diane Humetewa, Hopi federal judge
 Pamela Rae Huteson (born 1957), Haida/Tlingit, born 1957) artist, disc jockey and writer

I
Debora Iyall (born 1954), Cowlitz-descent singer and printmaker

J
 Sarah James (born 1946), Gwich'in environmental activist, 2002 Goldman Environmental Prize winner
 Jana (born 1980), Lumbee singer
 Viola Jimulla (1878–1966), Yavapai, chief of the Prescott Yavapai tribe
 Betty Mae Tiger Jumper (Florida Seminole, also known as Potackee (1923-2011), chairwoman, Florida Seminole Tribe (1967-1971), last matriarch of Snake Clan.
 Marie Smith Jones (1918–2008), Eyak activist and honorary chief, last known living speaker of the Eyak language
 Juana Maria (Nicoleño, died 1853), last member of her tribe

K
 Yvonne Kauger (born 1937), Cheyenne-Arapaho Oklahoma Supreme Court justice
 Geraldine Keams (born 1951), Navajo Nation actress
 Adrienne Keene (born 1985), Cherokee Nation academic, writer, activist, and podcaster
 Maude Kegg (1906–1996), Ojibwa bead worker and traditionalist
 Louisa Keyser  Dat So La Lee (ca. 1829–1925), Washoe basket weaver
 Loretta Kelsey, last living speaker of Elem Pomo
 Edith Kilbuck, Lenape missionary
 Mary Killman, Citizen Potawatomi, Olympic synchronized swimmer, b. 1991
 Kuiliy, Pend d'Oreille warrior
 Kimberly Tilsen-Brave Heart, an Oglala Lakota and Jewish businesswoman and chef from South Dakota.

L
 Madeline La Framboise (1740–1846), Odawa fur trader
 Winona LaDuke (born 1959), White Earth Ojibwe activist, environmentalist, economist, and writer
 Carole LaFavor, two-spirit Ojibwa novelist and activist
 Naomi Lang (born 1978), Karuk figure skater and ice dancer
 Moscelyne Larkin (born 1925), Peoria/Shawnee ballerina
 Sally Larsen (born 1954), Apache/Aleut photographer
 Sharmagne Leland-St. John, Nespelem poet
 Kelsey Leonard, (Shinnecock Indian Nation) first Native American woman to earn a degree from the University of Oxford
 Edmonia Lewis (ca. 1845–1907), African/Mississauga Ojibwe sculptor
 Lucy M. Lewis (1898–1992), Acoma Pueblo potter
Linda Lomahaftewa, Hopi/Choctaw painter, printmaker, and educator
 Lozen, Apache warrior, spiritual leader, and compatriot to Geronimo
 Merina Lujan (Pop Chalee), Taos Pueblo painter

M
 Wilma Mankiller (Cherokee Nation, 1945–2010), first female Principal Chief of the Cherokee Nation
 Maria Martinez (San Ildefonso Pueblo, 1887–1980)), potter
 Barbara McAlister, Cherokee Nation opera singer and artist
 Mabel McKay (Pomo/Patwin, 1907–1993) basket maker, medicine woman
 Doris McLemore (Wichita tribe, 1927–2016), last fluent speaker of the Wichita language
 Isabel Meadows (1846–1939), Rumsen Ohlone language consultant and last speaker of the Rumsen language
 Grace Medicine Flower, Santa Clara Pueblo ceramic artist
 Melissa Melero-Moose (Northern Paiute/Modoc) mixed-media artist, curator
 Methoataske, mother of Tecumseh and Tenskwatawa (Shawnee)
 Elaine Miles (born 1960), Cayuse-Nez Perce actress
 Devon A. Mihesuah, Choctaw Nation writer
 Deborah A. Miranda, Esselen/Chumash-French poet
 Nancy Marie Mithlo (Chiricahua Apache), curator, writer and professor
 Katrina Mitten, Miami Tribe of Oklahoma beadwork artist
 Catherine Montour (1710–1804), Seneca leader
 Mountain Wolf Woman (1884–1960), Ho-Chunk Native American Church member
 Moving Robe Woman, Hunkpapa Lakota fighter in the Battle of Little Bighorn
 Mary Musgrove, Muscogee Creek interpreter, trader, and political leader

N
 Helen Naha, Hopi aka "Feather Woman" potter
 Nampeyo, "Hano Nampeyo", (ca. 1859–1942) Hopi-Tewa potter
 Elva Nampeyo, Hopi-Tewa potter
 Fannie Nampeyo, Hopi-Tewa potter
 Iris Nampeyo, Hopi-Tewa potter
 Dextra Nampeyo Quotskuyva, Hopi-Tewa (daughter of Rachel) potter
 Nora Naranjo Morse, Santa Clara Pueblo potter
 Sally Noble (Chimariko), last speaker of the Chimariko language
 Roscinda Nolasquez (Cupeño, 1892–1987), last known speaker of the Cupeño language

O
 Hannah Ocuish (Peqquot, died 1786), executed
 Dora Old Elk (born 1977), Apsáalooke/Sioux artist
 Old-Lady-Grieves-The-Enemy, Pawnee warrior
 Diane O'Leary, Comanche, 1939–2013, artist, nurse
 One Who Walks With the Stars, Oglala Lakota warrior in the Battle of Little Bighorn

P
 LaRue Parker (Caddo Nation, 1935–2011), chairperson
 Deborah Parker (Tulalip, born 1970), activist and former vice-chair of the Tulalip Tribes
 Essie Parrish (Kashaya Pomo, 1902–1979), basket weaver, author
 Elise Paschen (Osage Nation), poet
 Lotsee Patterson (Comanche), librarian and professor
 Tillie Paul (Tlingit, 1863–1952), educator and Presbyterian Church activist
 Elizabeth Peratrovich (Tlingit, 1911–1958), civil rights activist
 Susan La Flesche Picotte (1865–1915), Omaha/Ponca/Iowa, first female Native American physician
 Lori Piestewa (Hopi, 1979–2003), soldier killed in Iraq
 Pine Leaf, Crow warrior
 Pocahontas (Powhatan, 1595–1617),  diplomat, wife of John Rolfe, rescued Captain John Smith from his execution
 Freda Porter (Lumbee, born 1957),  applied mathematician and environmental scientist
 Pretty-Shield (Crow Nation), medicine woman and autobiographer

Q
 Jaune Quick-To-See Smith (Salish-Kootenai/Shoshone/Métis, born 1940) artist

R
 Rattling Blanket Woman (Miniconjou), mother of Crazy Horse
 Delphine Red Shirt, Oglala writer and chair of Nongovernmental Organization Committee on the International Decade of the World's Indigenous Peoples at the United Nations
 Jeri Redcorn, Caddo/Citizen Potawatomi (born ca. 1940), potter
 Red Wing (1884–1974), Winnebago silent film actress
 Luana Reyes, Confederated Colville Tribes (Sinixt) health activist and educator, 1933–2001
 G. Anne Richardson, chief of the Rappahannock tribe
 Toby Riddle (1848–1920), Modoc interpreter and diplomat
 Luana Ross, Confederated Salish and Kootenai Tribes sociologist and author
 Wendy Rose (Hopi/Miwok, born 1948) anthropologist and writer
 Running Eagle, Blackfoot war chief

S
 Sacagawea (ca. 1787–1812), Shoshone guide for the Lewis and Clark Expedition, wife of Toussaint Charbonneau
 Shoni Schimmel (born 1992), Umatilla basketball player
 Jane Johnston Schoolcraft (1800–1842), Sault Ste. Marie Ojibwe writer
 Anfesia Shapsnikoff (1901–1973), Aleut artist and educator
 Joanne Shenandoah (Oneida Indian Nation, 1957–2022), singer and guitarist
 Clara Sherman (Navajo, 1914–2010), weaver
 Leslie Marmon Silko (born 1948), Laguna Pueblo/Keres writer
 Pauline Small (1924–2005), first female leader of the Crow Nation
 Cynthia Leitich Smith, Muscogee Creek Nation children's author
 Lois Bougetah Smoky (1907–1981), Kiowa painter and bead artist
 Molly Spotted Elk (1903–1977), Penobscot actress and dancer
 Minnie Spotted-Wolf (Blackfeet), first female Native American Marine
 Boeda Strand (Snohomish , 1834–1928), basket weaver
 Virginia Stroud (Keetoowah Cherokee/Muscogee Creek, born 1951) painter, author, and former Miss Indian America.
 Anita Louise Suazo, Santa Clara Pueblo potter
 Madonna Swan (Lakota, 1928–1993), educator, memoirist
 Roxanne Swentzell, Santa Clara Pueblo ceramicist and sculptor

T
 Tacumwah (ca. 1720–ca. 1790), chief of the Miami tribe and businesswoman
 Margaret Tafoya, (1904–2001) Santa Clara Pueblo potter
 Maria Tallchief (1925–2013), Osage ballerina
 Marjorie Tallchief, Osage ballerina
 Mary TallMountain, Koyukon and Irish-Scottish poet and storyteller
 Margo Tamez (born 1962), Jumano Apache/Lipan Apache activist, poet, community historian, educator
 Gladys Tantaquidgeon (1899–2005), Mohegan elder, anthropologist, historian, and medicine woman
 Luci Tapahonso (born 1953), Navajo poet and lecturer
 Leonidas Tapia (died 1977), Ohkay Owingeh Pueblo potter
 Kimberly Teehee (born 1968), Cherokee Nation senior policy advisor for Native American Affairs in the White House Domestic Policy Council
 Kateri Tekakwitha (1656–1680), Mohawk/Algonquian woman canonized by the Roman Catholic church
 Lucy Telles, Mono Lake Paiute/Yosemite Miwok basketweaver, ca. 1885-1955
 Charlene Teters, Spokane tribe artist, writer, activist, educator, and lecturer
 The Other Magpie, Crow fighter at the Battle of the Rosebud
 Jennie Thlunaut (1892–1986), Tlingit artist
 Lucy Thompson (1856–1932), Yurok writer
 Jennie Thlunaut, Tlingit (1982–1986) Chilkat weaver
 Susette LaFlesche Tibbles (1854–1903), Omaha/Iowa/Ponca lecturer, writer, and artist
 Sheila Tousey (born 1960), Menominee/Stockbridge-Munsee actress
 Toypurina (born 1761), Tongva medicine woman and rebel
 Gail Tremblay, Onondaga/Mi'kmaq artist and poet
 Catherine Troeh (1911–2007), Chinook activist, artist, elder, historian
 Hulleah Tsinhnahjinnie, Muscogee Creek/Seminole/Navajo photographer
 Faye Tso (1933–2004), Navajo potter 
 Minnie Two Shoes, Assiniboine journalist 
 Tyonajanegen, Oneida woman who fought in the 1777 Battle of Oriskany during the American Revolutionary War

U
 Paula Underwood, Oneida historian
 Carrie Underwood, Muscogee Creek Nation enrolled tribal member, singer
 Atalie Unkalunt (1895-1954), Cherokee Nation, opera and Indianist singer
 Misty Upham (1982–2014), Blackfeet Nation actress

V
 Pablita Velarde, Tse Tsan (1918–2006), Santa Clara Pueblo painter

W
 Velma Wallis, Athabascan writer
 Kay WalkingStick, Cherokee Nation painter and educator
 Wanagapeth (Miami tribe, died 1908), daughter of Chief Michikinikwa
 Yvonne Wanrow (born 1943), of the Confederated Tribes of the Colville Reservation
 Nancy Ward (ca. 1738–1822 or 1824), Cherokee leader
 Ingrid Washinawatok (1957–1999), assassinated Menominee activist
 Watseka (1810–1878), Potawatomi woman for whom Watseka, Illinois, is named
 Mary Jo Watson, PhD, Seminole art historian, curator, educator
 Marie Watt (born 1967), Seneca artist
 Annie Dodge Wauneka (1910–1997), Navajo activist and author
 Weetamoo (ca. 1635–1676), Wampanoag chief
 Claudette White, Quechan activist and judge
 Charmaine White Face, Oglala Lakota activist and writer
 Emmi Whitehorse (born 1958), Navajo painter
 Matika Wilbur (born 1984), Swinomish/Tulalip photographer and podcaster
 Lorraine Williams, Navajo potter
 Holly Wilson (Delaware Nation/Cherokee, born 1968), sculptor, installation artist
 Sarah Winnemucca (ca. 1841–1891), Northern Paiute activist and writer
 Woman Chief (c. 1806–1858), Crow chief and warrior
 Elizabeth Woody, Warm Springs/Navajo/Wasco writer

Y
 Melanie Yazzie, Navajo printmaker and educator
 Mary Youngblood, Aleut-Seminole flutist

Z
 Ofelia Zepeda, Tohono O'odham linguist and writer
 Zitkala-Sa (1876–1938), Yankton Dakota writer, editor, musician, teacher and activist

See also
 Gender roles in First Nations and Native American tribes
 Native American women in the arts

References

Sources 
 Bataille, Gretchen M. and Laurie Lisa. Native American Women: A Biographical Dictionary. Routledge Taylor and Francis Group, 2001. .
 McClinton-Temple, Jennifer and Alan Velie. Encyclopedia of American Indian Literature. New York: Facts on File, 2007. .
 Porter, Joy and Kenneth M. Roemer, eds. The Cambridge Companion To Native American Literature. Cambridge, UK: Cambridge University Press, 2005. .

Native American
Women
Native American women